Asan Mugunghwa Football Club was a South Korean football club based in Asan. The club's players were South Korean professional footballers who were serving their two-year military duty.

History

Founding and Police FC era
Founded as National Police Department FC in 1961, the club changed its name to Seoul Police Department FC in 1962 then back to its original name in 1967. During its history it won a number of competitions such as the Korean President's Cup National Football Tournament and the Korea Semi-Professional Football League in the 1960s before it was dissolved in November 1967. The club was reinstated in 1996, and it partly consisted of players serving their compulsory two-year military duty, similar to the other military club, Sangju Sangmu FC.

Professionalization and Ansan era (2013–2016)
In 2013, Police FC joined the K League Challenge.

In February 2014, Police FC was based in Ansan (Ansan Wa~ Stadium) and renamed to Ansan Police FC.

In January 2016, the club name was changed to Ansan Mugunghwa FC. The Korean word Mugunghwa means hibiscus syriacus and is the symbol of the Korean Police.

Asan era (2017–2019)
After the 2016 season, Ansan Mugunghwa moved to the unrelated Asan, becoming Asan Mugunghwa FC. Per K League policies, the new team did not take over records and history of the previous one and were registered as a different team. Asan Mugunghwa were disbanded in 2019 to make way for another team, Chungnam Asan FC, which have no ties to the police at all.

Club name history
1996–2013: Police FC
2014–2015: Ansan Police FC
2016: Ansan Mugunghwa FC
2017–2019: Asan Mugunghwa FC

Honours

Asan Mugunghwa (2017–2019)
 K League 2
Winners (1): 2018

Ansan Mugunghwa (2014–2016)
 K League Challenge
Winners (1): 2016

Police FC (1996–2013)
 K League Challenge
Runners-up (1): 2013

 National Semi-Professional Football League
Winners (1): 2002 Fall

Managers

References

External links

 
K League 2 clubs
Military association football clubs in South Korea
Association football clubs established in 1961
Association football clubs disestablished in 1967
Association football clubs established in 1996
Association football clubs disestablished in 2013
Association football clubs established in 2014
Association football clubs disestablished in 2016
Association football clubs established in 2017
Association football clubs disestablished in 2019
1961 establishments in South Korea
1967 disestablishments in South Korea
1996 establishments in South Korea
2013 disestablishments in South Korea
2014 establishments in South Korea
2016 establishments in South Korea
2017 establishments in South Korea
2019 establishments in South Korea
Sport in Gyeonggi Province
Ansan
Police association football clubs in South Korea
Korean Police FC